Laomediidae is a family of crustaceans belonging to the infraorder Gebiidea, within the order Decapoda.

It contains the following genera:
 Jaxea Nardo, 1847
 Laomedia De Haan, 1841
 Naushonia Kingsley, 1897
 Reschia Schweigert, 2009
 Saintlaurentiella Paiva, Tavares & Silva-Neto, 2010
 Strianassa Anker, 2020

References

Decapods
Decapod families